The following is a list of state roads in the U.S. state of Florida. Only the length of state-maintained roads is given; occasionally a locally maintained connection is signed as part of a state road.

Routes

Truck routes
These routes are partially signed over locally maintained roads.
Florida State Road 14 Truck, Madison
Florida State Road 29 Truck, LaBelle
Florida State Road 39, Plant City
Florida State Road 230, Starke

References

 
State roads